Mera Kya Qasoor Tha is a Pakistani social drama series, produced by Taimur Usman Khawja and Raziuddin Ahmad. The drama airs twice weekly on Geo Entertainment every Saturday and Sunday. It stars Zahid Ahmed, Atiqa Odho and Sonia Mishal in lead roles. The story of the serial tackles issue of child marriages.

Cast
Zahid Ahmed as Rohail
Sonia Mishal as Shaista
Atiqa Odho
Imran Aslam
Imaan Zaidi
Sohail Asghar
Shehryar Zaidi
Rashid Farooqui
Hashim Butt
Munawwar Saeed
Humaira Bano
Ismat Zaidi
Sama Shah
Hassam Khan
Kaiser Khan Nizamani
Usman Patel
Hafsa Butt

References

Pakistani drama television series
2016 Pakistani television series debuts
2017 Pakistani television series endings
Urdu-language television shows
Geo TV original programming